The Smith & Wesson 1000 Series are semi-automatic shotguns offered by Smith & Wesson circa 2007 to 2010. The shotguns were manufactured at a Smith & Wesson facility in Turkey.

History
In November 2006, Smith & Wesson announced that it would re-enter the shotgun market with two new lines of shotguns, the 1000 Series and the break-open Elite Series, unveiled at the 2007 SHOT Show. Both series were manufactured in Turkey.

The 1000 Series was offered in four models:
 1012 – 12-gauge chambered for  shotshells; barrel lengths  in 2-inch increments
 1012 Super – same as 1012, except chambered for  magnum shotshells
 1020 – 20-gauge with same chambering and barrel lengths as the 1012
 1020SS – "short stock" 1020;  barrel and  overall length
 
The 1000 Series was discontinued by September 2010.

References

Further reading

External links
 Smith and Wesson 1020 Shotgun Disassembly via YouTube

Smith & Wesson firearms
Semi-automatic shotguns
Weapons and ammunition introduced in 2007